The 2012 Generali Ladies Linz was a tennis tournament played on indoor hard courts. It was the 26th edition of the Generali Ladies Linz, and part of the WTA International tournaments of the 2012 WTA Tour. It was held at the TipsArena Linz in Linz, Austria, from October 8 through October 14, 2012.

Singles main-draw entrants

Seeds

 Rankings are as of October 1, 2012

Other entrants
The following players received wildcards into the singles main draw:
  Ana Ivanovic
  Patricia Mayr-Achleitner
  Andrea Petkovic

The following players received entry from the qualifying draw:
  Mallory Burdette
  Kirsten Flipkens
  Bethanie Mattek-Sands
  Lesia Tsurenko

The following players received entry as lucky losers:
  Irina-Camelia Begu
  Catalina Castaño

Withdrawals
  Iveta Benešová
  Dominika Cibulková (shoulder injury)
  Roberta Vinci
  Anna Tatishvili (viral infection)
  Yanina Wickmayer (viral illness)

Retirements
  Lesia Tsurenko (shoulder injury)

Doubles main-draw entrants

Seeds

1 Rankings are as of October 1, 2012

Other entrants
The following pairs received wildcards into the doubles main draw:
  Barbara Haas /  Patricia Mayr-Achleitner
  Romina Oprandi /  Andrea Petkovic
The following pair received entry as alternates:
  Kiki Bertens /  Arantxa Rus

Retirements
  Vladimíra Uhlířová (back injury)

Champions

Singles

 Victoria Azarenka def.  Julia Görges, 6–3, 6–4

Doubles

 Anna-Lena Grönefeld /  Květa Peschke def.  Julia Görges /  Barbora Záhlavová-Strýcová, 6–3, 6–4

References

External links
Official website

Generali Ladies Linz
2012
Generali Ladies Linz
Generali Ladies Linz
Generali